"So Done" is a song by American singer Alicia Keys featuring Khalid. It was written by the artists alongside producer Ludwig Göransson. The song was released on August 14, 2020, through RCA Records as the sixth single from Keys' seventh studio album Alicia. The song is a mid-tempo R&B song and talks about living freely and on your own terms. A music video directed by Andy Hines was released on the same day and stars actress Sasha Lane alongside Keys and Khalid.

Critical reception
Entertainment Voice'''s Adi Mehta wrote that the song "reaches new emotional depths, with a vulnerable intimacy from Keys that sends chills", adding that Keys and Khalid sound "wide-eyed and dreamy" on the song. Andy Kellman from AllMusic described it as "soft, intimate love ballad" on which "Keys and Khalid make an ideal pair". Meg Bishop from Minnesota Daily wrote that "[l]istening to the track feels like an act of self-care" adding that "[t]he song fits perfectly into the tracklist" with "some smooth lo-fi beats" and "the repeated lyrics, “I’m living the way that I want.”. Konstantinos Pappis from Our Culture Mag wrote that the song features “spare electric guitar and luminous vocals“ and that it “excel[s] at capturing an utterly entrancing mood” and “evokes a kind of listless, late-night vibe that somehow manages to amplify the album’s overall message of inner strength”. 

Live performances
Keys performed the song at the iHeartRadio Music Festival on September 18, 2020. Keys performed the song during Good Morning America on September 19, 2020. Keys and Khalid performed the song together as part of the drive-in concert series on The Late Late Show with James Corden'' on September 22, 2020. The song is performed as part of The Alicia + Keys World Tour.

Charts

Weekly charts

Year-end charts

Certifications

References

2020 songs
2020 singles
Alicia Keys songs
Khalid (singer) songs
RCA Records singles
Songs written by Alicia Keys
Songs written by Khalid (singer)